The Ranfurly Shield, colloquially known as the Log o' Wood, is perhaps the most prestigious trophy in New Zealand's domestic rugby union competition. First played for in 1904, the Ranfurly Shield is based on a challenge system, rather than a league or knockout competition as with most football trophies. The holding union must defend the Shield in challenge matches, and if a challenger defeats them, they become the new holder of the Shield.

Holders
Two different unions held the Ranfurly Shield between 1940 and 1949. Due to the outbreak of World War 2, however, no matches were played between 1940 and 1945.

Fixtures

1946

1947

1948

1949

References

Sources

External links 
 Results at Scrum.co.nz

1940-49
1946 in New Zealand rugby union
1947 in New Zealand rugby union
1948 in New Zealand rugby union
1949 in New Zealand rugby union